Hypocolpus is a genus of crabs in the family Xanthidae, containing the following species:
Hypocolpus abbotti (Rathbun, 1894)
Hypocolpus diverticulatus (Strahl, 1861)
Hypocolpus guinotae Vannini, 1982
Hypocolpus haanii Rathbun, 1909
Hypocolpus kurodai Takeda, 1980
Hypocolpus maculatus (Haswell, 1882)
Hypocolpus mararae Crosnier, 1991
Hypocolpus pararugosus Crosnier, 1997
Hypocolpus pardii Galil & Vannini, 1990
Hypocolpus perfectus Guinot-Dumortier, 1960
Hypocolpus rugosus (Henderson, 1893)
Hypocolpus stenocoelus Guinot-Dumortier, 1960

References

Xanthoidea
Taxa named by Mary J. Rathbun